Climate finance is "finance that aims at reducing emissions, and enhancing sinks of greenhouse gases and aims at reducing vulnerability of, and maintaining and increasing the resilience of, human and ecological systems to negative climate change impacts", as defined by the United Nations Framework Convention on Climate Change (UNFCCC)  Standing Committee on Finance. The term has been used in a narrow sense to refer to transfers of public resources from developed to developing countries, in light of their UN Climate Convention obligations to provide "new and additional financial resources", and in a wider sense to refer to all financial flows relating to climate change mitigation and adaptation.

The 21st session of the Conference of Parties (COP) to the UNFCCC (Paris 2015) introduced a new era for climate finance, policies, and markets. The Paris Agreement adopted there defined a global action plan to put the world on track to avoid dangerous climate change by limiting global warming to well below 2 °C above preindustrial levels. It includes climate financing channeled by national, regional and international entities for climate change mitigation and adaptation projects and programs. They include climate specific support mechanisms and financial aid for mitigation and adaptation activities to spur and enable the transition towards low-carbon, climate-resilient growth and development through capacity building, R&D and economic development.

As of November 2020, development banks and private finance had not reached the US$100 billion per year investment stipulated in the UN climate negotiations for 2020. However, in the face of the COVID-19 pandemic's economic downturn, 450 development banks pledged to fund a "Green recovery" in developing countries.

During the COVID-19 pandemic, climate change was addressed by 43% of EU enterprises. Despite the pandemic's effect on businesses, the percentage of firms planning climate-related investment rose to 47%. This was a rise from 2020, when the percentage of climate related investment was at 41%. Climate investment in Europe is, admittedly, growing this decade. However, the need for the EU's "Fit for 55" climate package remains 356 billion euros a year. Since 2020, US firms' desire to innovate has increased, whereas European firms' has decreased.

Flows of climate finance

A number of initiatives are underway to monitor and track flows of international climate finance. Analysts at Climate Policy Initiative have tracked public and private sector climate finance flows from a variety of sources on a yearly basis since 2011. In 2019, they estimated that annual climate finance reached more than US$600  billion. This work has fed into the United Nations Framework Convention on Climate Change Biennial Assessment and Overview of Climate Finance Flows  and the IPCC Fifth Assessment Report chapter on climate finance. This and other research suggest a need for more efficient monitoring of climate finance flows. In particular, they suggest that funds can do better at synchronizing their reporting of data, being consistent in the way that they report their figures, and providing detailed information on the implementation of projects and programs over time.

The estimates of the climate finance gap - that is, the shortfall in investment - vary according to the geographies, sectors and activities included, timescale and phasing, target and the underlying assumptions.In 2010, the World Development Report preliminary estimates of financing needs for mitigation and adaptation activities in developing countries range from $140 to 175  billion per year for mitigation over the next 20 years with associated financing needs of $265–565 billion and $30–100 billion a year over the period 2010–2050 for adaptation.

The International Energy Agency's 2011 World Energy Outlook (WEO) estimates that in order to meet the growing demand for energy through 2035, $16.9  trillion in new investment for new power generation is projected, with renewable energy (RE) comprising 60% of the total. The capital required to meet projected energy demand through 2030 amounts to $1.1  trillion per year on average, distributed (almost evenly) between the large emerging economies (China, India, Brazil, etc.) and the remaining developing countries. It is believed that over the next 15 years, the world will require about $90 trillion in new infrastructure – most of it in developing and middle-income countries. The IEA estimates that limiting the rise in global temperature to below 2 Celsius by the end of the century will require an average of $3.5 trillion a year in energy sector investments until 2050.

It has been estimated that only 0.12% of all funding for climate-related research is spent on the social science of climate change mitigation. Vastly more funding is spent on natural science studies of climate change and considerable sums are also spent on studies of the impact of and adaptation to climate change. It has been argued that this is a misallocation of resources, as the most urgent puzzle at the current juncture is to work out how to change human behavior to mitigate climate change, whereas the natural science of climate change is already well established and there will be decades and centuries to handle adaptation.

Multilateral climate finance
The multilateral climate funds (i.e. governed by multiple national governments) are important for paying out money in climate finance. The largest multilateral climate funds are the Climate Investment Funds (CIFs), Green Climate Fund (GCF),  Adaptation Fund (AF), and Global Environment Facility (GEF). In 2016, these four funds approved $2.78 billion of project support. India received the largest total amount of single-country support, followed by Ukraine and Chile. Tuvalu received the most funding per person, followed by Samoa and Dominica. The US is the largest donor across the four funds, while Norway makes the largest contribution relative to population size. Most multilateral climate funds use a wide range of financing instruments, including grants, debt, equity, and risk mitigation options. These are intended to crowd in other sources of finance, whether from domestic governments, other donors, or the private sector. The Climate-Smart Urbanization Program is an initiative by the Climate Investment Funds (CIFs) meant to support cities. The Climate Investment Funds has been important in climate financiesince 2008.

The Green Climate Fund is currently the largest multilateral climate fund, and climate change and development practitioners alike are focused on seeing these resources flow.

Climate financing by the world's six largest multilateral development banks (MDBs) rose to a seven-year high of $35.2 billion in 2017. According to IRENA, the global energy transition could contribute $19 trillion in economic gains by 2050.

Since 2012, the European Investment Bank has provided €170 billion in climate funding, which has funded over €600 billion in programs to mitigate emissions and help people respond to climate change and biodiversity depletion across Europe and the world.

In 2009, developed countries committed to jointly mobilize $100 billion annually in climate finance by 2020 to support developing countries in reducing emissions and adapting to climate change. They claim that climate finance provided and mobilized reached $83.3bn in 2020. But the money given for climate change was only worth about a third of what was said ($21–24.5bn).

Private climate finance
Public finance has traditionally been a significant source of infrastructure investment. However, public budgets are often insufficient for larger and more complex infrastructure projects, particularly in lower-income countries. Climate-compatible investments often have higher investment needs than conventional (fossil fuel) measures, and may also carry higher financial risks because the technologies are not proven or the projects have high upfront costs. If countries are going to access the scale of funding required, it is critical to consider the full spectrum of funding sources and their requirements, as well as the different mechanisms available from them, and how they can be combined. There is therefore growing recognition that private finance will be needed to cover the financing shortfall.

Private investors could be drawn to sustainable urban infrastructure projects where a sufficient return on investment is forecast based on project income flows or low-risk government debt repayments. Bankability and creditworthiness are therefore prerequisites to attracting private finance. Potential sources of climate finance include commercial banks, investment companies, pension funds, insurance companies and sovereign wealth funds. These different investor types will have different risk-return expectations and investment horizons, and projects will need to be structured appropriately.

Governments have a range of financing and funding mechanisms available to secure finance from private investors, including equity, debt, grants or risk mitigation instruments such as guarantees. Some of these instruments will be used routinely as part of a government's funding base; others may be deployed to mobilize the investment for a specific climate project.

Methods and means

Debt-for-climate swaps 
Debt-for-climate swaps happen where debt accumulated by a country is repaid upon fresh discounted terms agreed between the debtor and creditor, where repayment funds in local currency are redirected to domestic projects that boost climate mitigation and adaptation activities. Climate mitigation activities that can benefit from debt-for-climate swaps includes projects that enhance carbon sequestration, renewable energy and conservation of biodiversity as well as oceans. 

For instance, Argentina succeed in carrying out such a swap which was implemented by the Environment Minister at the time, Romina Picolotti. The value of debt addressed was $38,100,000 and the environmental swap was $3,100,000 which was redirected to conservation of biodiversity, forests and other climate mitigation activities. Seychelles in collaboration with the Nature Conservancy also undertook a similar debt-for-nature swap where $27 million of debt was redirected to establish marine parks, ocean conservation and ecotourism activities.

Goals of climate finance 
Climate Finance works to provide the necessary monetary backing to fight the adverse effects of climate change. It connects government intervention with the private sector to develop innovative climate change solutions. Some of these include pollutant purification, energy efficiency, and infrastructure. 

Biden's executive order's primary purpose is to "encourage consistent, transparent, intelligible, comparable, and accurate disclosure of climate-related financial risk, including both physical and transitional risk. "Acting on that danger, he argues, is as important as addressing how it disproportionately affects poor populations, particularly people of color. In March 2021, the SEC asked for public feedback on actions it should take to ensure that public corporations be honest about their climate risks and consequences.

Economic costs of climate change 

Temperature increase: 

Experts speculate that if global temperatures rise by 3.2°C, this could decrease world GDP by up to 18%. This decline could be limited to 4% if targets set in Paris Agreement are met, since it would be less than 2 °C increase in global temperatures. 

Sea Level Rise: 

This would entail more frequent and severe flooding in coastal regions and it has the potential to cause damages in the trillions of dollars as well as threatens countless lives of those living in coastal regions.

Natural Disasters: 

These include earthquakes, forest fires, mudslides, droughts, and other natural phenomena. These have cost the world $640.3 billion over the past 5 years.

Some banking regulators had already begun to take steps in this regard. In September, the Commodity Futures Trading Commission became the first U.S. regulator to explicitly warn that increasing temperatures might jeopardize U.S. financial stability.

Residents of Louisiana's rapidly dwindling island hamlet of Isle de Jean Charles, many of whom are Biloxi-Chitimacha-Choctaw tribe members, have become widely recognized in the last decade as the country's first climate refugees. In other regions of the world, entire island nations are being forced to evacuate as their homes disappear beneath increasing sea levels.

Current funding of renewables and green alternatives 

Some estimates say $100 billion is required each year to fund required climate investments. However, most countries do not have the resources, which requires wealthier developed nations to contribute the most. Also, it is important to note that the amount of money that could be lost due to the events of climate change likely outweighs the amount necessary to implement sustainable initiatives

A meta-analysis from 2023 reported results about "required technology-level investment shifts for climate-relevant infrastructure until 2035" within the EU, and found these are "most drastic for power plants, electricity grids and rail infrastructure", ~87€ billion above the planned budgets in the near-term (2021–25), and in need of sustainable finance policies.

Financial incentives 
A carbon tax is a price set by government that companies and consumers must pay for each ton of greenhouse gas emitted. There are two types of carbon taxes that include an emissions tax and a goods tax. Another concept is anEmissions Trading System(ETS) which puts a market price on emissions and creates a cap on total emissions allowances while letting companies buy/sell these allowances. Reducing subsidies to oil companies is also an important way to mitigate the effects of climate change. Subsidies reduce the price of fossil fuels which encourages consumption of these fuels and in turn increases emissions. 53 countries recently reformed fossil fuels subsidies , however annual subsidies still amount to almost half a trillion dollars.

See also
 Sustainable finance
 Adaptation Fund
 Climate Investment Funds
 Climate-related asset stranding
 Eco-investing
 Fossil fuel divestment
 Global Environment Facility
 Green Climate Fund
 KfW IPEX-Bank
 Climate finance accountability mechanisms - Accountability mechanisms in international climate change financing

External links 

 Climate Finance Landscape - Global Landscape of Climate Finance 2019

References

Ethical investment
Renewable energy commercialization